Queens Park is a significant park in Moonee Ponds, a northern suburb of Melbourne, Australia.

Location 
Located in Moonee Ponds bound by the following roads;
Mount Alexander Road, The Strand, Pascoe Vale Road, Kellaway Avenue

History 
Following the discovery of gold in Victoria in 1851, travellers heading for the goldfields met here because fresh water was available in the lagoon. On 20 August 1860, the Burke and Wills expedition camped here on their fateful journey to cross Australia.

In 1865, Baron Ferdinand Von Mueller (Director of the Melbourne Botanic Gardens) sent 250 specimens to Essendon Borough council, many of which were planted at Queens Park.

Description 
A picturesque cottage is the focal point of the park with its idyllic surrounds and public art pieces. A sealed path surrounds the lake where seats, and picnic tables are provided beneath old established native and exotic trees, with the lake a haven for a variety of birds. A tropical garden, sunken garden and native gardens are some of the many attractions of the park. Concerts and other entertainments are common on weekends.

Botanic Collection 

The park boasts an extensive botanic collection, including established Moreton Bay Figs, Bunya Pines and Hoop Pines. It also features a Cycad collection, several native/indigenous gardens, seasonal annual displays, and an asian-styled garden.

Facilities within the park 
 Moonee Ponds Bowling Club 
 Queens Park Pool 
 Queens Park Curator's Cottage Cafe

References

External links 
 Moonee Valley City Council
 Queens Park information
 History Of Queens Park

Parks in Melbourne
City of Moonee Valley